Summit Bancorp was a bank based in Summit, New Jersey, that operated in New Jersey, Pennsylvania, and Connecticut. In 2001, it was acquired by FleetBoston Financial.

History
The bank was organized in 1899.

In 1968, the bank organized a Pennsylvania entity.

In 1994, the company acquired the Bankers Corporation and the Crestmont Financial Corporation. 

In 1995, the company was acquired by UJB Financial Corporation. UJB Financial adopted the Summit Bancorp name. 

In 1996, the company acquired B.M.J. Financial Corporation for $164.5 million in stock. 

In 1997, the company acquired Collective Bancorp. 

In 1998, the company acquired NSS Bancorp and New Canaan Bank and Trust Company.

In February 1999, the company acquired Prime Bancorp.

In November 1999, the company announced layoffs of 250 people.

In 2001, the company was acquired by FleetBoston Financial for $7 billion in stock. As part of the transaction, the company's trust business was sold to The Bank of New York Mellon. In 2004, Fleet was acquired by Bank of America.

References

1891 establishments in New Jersey
2001 disestablishments in New Jersey
Bank of America legacy banks
Banks disestablished in 2001
Banks established in 1891
Defunct banks of the United States
Defunct companies based in New Jersey